Henricus "Rick" Nicolas van den Hurk (Eindhoven, May 22, 1985) is a Dutch former professional baseball pitcher. He pitched in Major League Baseball (MLB) for the Florida Marlins, Baltimore Orioles, and Pittsburgh Pirates, in the KBO League for the Samsung Lions and in Nippon Professional Baseball (NPB) for the Fukuoka SoftBank Hawks and Tokyo Yakult Swallows. In international play, he was a member of the Netherlands national baseball team.

Early years
At the age of 16, van den Hurk was scouted by Chicho Jesurun when playing for the Oosterhout baseball team Twins, where his father was coach. He went to Fort Lauderdale Preparatory School where he graduated in 2003.

Professional career

Florida Marlins
van den Hurk was signed by the Florida Marlins as an international free agent in 2002. van den Hurk made his professional debut with the GCL Marlins in 2003, pitching to a 2-6 record and 5.35 ERA in 11 games. In 2004, Van den Hurk logged a 2-3 record and 3.26 ERA in 14 games for the High-A Jupiter Hammerheads. In , van den Hurk started five games for the Gulf Coast League Marlins in rookie ball and three more games for the Jupiter Hammerheads of High-A. In the rookie league, van den Hurk allowed just two runs on four hits in 15 innings of work, while striking out 26 batters. With the Hammerheads, he allowed three earned runs on five hits through ten innings and striking out 15.

On April 9, 2007, van den Hurk was promoted to the Marlins from the Double-A Carolina Mudcats when pitcher Ricky Nolasco was placed on the disabled list. At the time of his debut, he was the youngest player in the National League. He made his first major league appearance on April 10, starting against the Milwaukee Brewers. A rain delay cut his debut short after 4 innings, in which he allowed one earned run on five hits, with five strikeouts and three walks.

van den Hurk was sent back to Double-A after the team's April 24 loss to the Atlanta Braves. In his fourth appearance, he pitched just one inning while giving up six earned runs on four hits and four walks. Pitcher Nate Field was called up from Triple-A Albuquerque to take his roster spot.

On June 5, the Marlins called up van den Hurk to throw the second game of a double header. He went six innings without giving up a hit until Yunel Escobar hit a double to lead off the 7th inning. He did not give up a run and earned his first win. He was sent again to Double-A on June 16.

During the 2007 midseason, van den Hurk was selected to the All-Star Futures Game for which he received the win. He finished his rookie season with a 4-6 record and 6.83 ERA in 18 major league appearances. He began the 2008 season with the Double-A Carolina Mudcats, and was later promoted to the Triple-A Albuquerque Isotopes. On July 22, 2008, he was recalled to the majors on to start against the Atlanta Braves. He finished the 2008 season with a 7.71 ERA with 20 strikeouts in 14.0 innings pitched for Florida. He was assigned to the Triple-A New Orleans Zephyrs to begin the 2009 season. He was brought up again to join the rotation on July 20, 2009 when the Marlins sent struggling left-hander Andrew Miller to the minor leagues. His first opponent was the San Diego Padres with van den Hurk coming away the winner that day in a 3–2 game. He finished the 2009 season with a 3-2 record and 4.30 ERA in 11 appearances with the Marlins.

During November 2009, van den Hurk pitched for Gigantes de Carolina of the Puerto Rico Baseball League, a Winter Baseball league. Van den Hurk made three starts going 0–0 with an ERA of 2.50 striking out 13 in 18 innings, while walking just one. He began the 2010 season with Triple-A New Orleans, and also made 2 appearances for the Marlins, surrendering 4 runs in 1.1 innings.

Baltimore Orioles

On July 31, 2010, van den Hurk was traded to the Baltimore Orioles in exchange for Will Ohman. He was assigned to the Triple-A Norfolk Tides. On August 16, van den Hurk was recalled to the major leagues, and logged a 4.96 ERA in 7 appearances for Baltimore. On March 30, 2011, van den Hurk was outrighted off of the 40-man roster. He was assigned to Norfolk to begin the year, and pitched to a 9-13 record and 4.43 in 26 games. On September 1, van den Hurk was selected to the active roster, and pitched in 4 games, struggling to an 8.00 ERA. On January 24, 2012, van den Hurk was designated for assignment by Baltimore. On February 3, 2012, he was released by the Orioles organization.

Cleveland Indians
On February 22, 2012 the Toronto Blue Jays signed van den Hurk to a split contract.

van den Hurk was claimed off waivers by the Cleveland Indians on March 21, 2012, but was designated for assignment by the team on March 29. van den Hurk was subsequently ourighted to the Triple-A Columbus Clippers on April 4, 2012, but declined his minor league assignment and elected free agency two days later.

Pittsburgh Pirates
On April 11, 2012, van den Hurk signed a minor league contract with the Pittsburgh Pirates organization. He was assigned to the Triple-A Indianapolis Indians, and also appeared in 1 game for the High-A Bradenton Marauders, recording a 14-5 record and 3.06 ERA in 22 appearances. Van den Hurk was promoted to the Pirates on September 10, 2012. He appeared in 4 games for the Pirates, pitching to an 0-1 record in 2 innings. He was released on January 4, 2013 so he could pursue an opportunity in Korea.

Samsung Lions
On January 8, 2013, van den Hurk signed with the Samsung Lions of the Korea Baseball Organization for 2013. On April 17, 2013, Van den Hurk made his KBO debut. In his first KBO season, he logged a 7-9 record and 3.95 ERA with 137 strikeouts in 143.2 innings pitched, and also won the Korean Series with Samsung. In 2014, Van den Hurk finished with a 13–4 win–loss record, a 3.18 ERA (lowest ERA in KBO), and a league-high 180 strikeouts over 152 innings pitched. He won the Korean Series for the second consecutive year with Samsung and became a free agent after the season.

Fukuoka SoftBank Hawks
On December 26, 2014, van den Hurk signed a contract with the Fukuoka SoftBank Hawks of Nippon Professional Baseball (NPB). On June 14, 2015, van den Hurk made his NPB debut. In 2015, he made 15 starts for the SoftBank Hawks, compiling a perfect 9-0 record, with a 2.52 ERA and a 0.97 WHIP. He struck out 120 batters in 93 innings pitched.

In 2016, in his second season with the Hawks, van den Hurk recorded 14 consecutive wins from his first game at Hawks. This was NPB's first record in 50 years. He finished 2016 with a 7-3 record in 13 starts, with a 3.84 ERA and a 0.96 WHIP. He struck out 92 batters in 82 innings pitched.

On January 4, 2017, he was selected as the Netherlands national baseball team in the 2017 World Baseball Classic. In 2017, van den Hurk played in 25 games with a record of 13-7 with an ERA of 3.24 striking out 162 in 153 innings pitched.

In 2018, he finished the regular season with a 10–7 Win–loss record, a 4.30 ERA, a 127 strikeouts in 138 innings. In the 2019 season, van den Hurk finished the regular season with a two games with two wins. On November 29, 2019, van den Hurk signed a 1-year extension to remain with the Hawks. In 2020, van den Hurk pitched to a 2-2 record and 6.92 ERA in 5 appearances for the Hawks. On December 2, 2020, he became a free agent.

Tokyo Yakult Swallows
On February 24, 2021, van den Hurk signed with Tokyo Yakult Swallows of NPB. van den Hurk was released by the Swallows on September 22, 2021.

On April 22, 2022, van den Hurk announced his retirement from professional baseball.

Post-playing career
On May 14, 2022, van den Hurk was named the technical director of the Royal Netherlands Baseball and Softball Federation.

References

External links 

VandenHurk – Korea Baseball Organization
Henricus VandenHurk – Samsung Lions
NPB.jp

Hurk, Rick
Hurk, Rick
Albuquerque Isotopes players
Baltimore Orioles players
Bradenton Marauders players
Carolina Mudcats players
Hurk, Rick
Hurk, Rick
Hurk, Rick
Florida Marlins players
Fukuoka SoftBank Hawks players
Gigantes de Carolina players
Expatriate baseball players in Puerto Rico
Greensboro Grasshoppers players
Gulf Coast Marlins players
Indianapolis Indians players
Jupiter Hammerheads players
KBO League pitchers
Major League Baseball pitchers
Hurk, Rick
National baseball team players
New Orleans Zephyrs players
Nippon Professional Baseball pitchers
Norfolk Tides players
Pittsburgh Pirates players
Samsung Lions players
Hurk, Rick
Tokyo Yakult Swallows players
Waikiki Beach Boys players
Hurk, Rick
Hurk, Rick